Karingamthuruth is a small village in the taluk of North Paravoor, in the Ernakulam district of Kerala, India.

References 

Villages in Ernakulam district